2 Ursae Minoris (2 UMi) is a single star a few degrees away from the northern celestial pole. Despite its Flamsteed designation, the star is actually located in the constellation Cepheus. This changed occurred when the constellation boundaries were formally set in 1930 by Eugene Delporte. Therefore, the star is usually referred only by its catalog numbers such as HR 285 or HD 5848. It is visible to the naked eye as a faint, orange-hued star with an apparent visual magnitude of 4.244. This object is located 280 light years away and is moving further from the Earth with a heliocentric radial velocity of +8 km/s. It is a candidate member of the Hyades Supercluster.

This is an aging K-type star with a stellar classification of K2 II-III, showing a luminosity class with blended traits of a giant and a bright giant. It has 2.3 times the mass of the Sun and has expanded to 24 times the Sun's radius. The star is radiating around 215 times the Sun's luminosity from its enlarged photosphere at an effective temperature of 4,513 K.

References

External links
Stars — 2 Ursae Minoris

K-type bright giants
K-type giants
Hyades Stream
Cepheus (constellation)
Durchmusterung objects
Ursae Minoris, 02
005372
005372
0285